Blue Highway is an international tourist route from Norway via Sweden and Finland to Russia.

Sights
The Blue Highway follows the ancient waterways from the Atlantic Ocean to Lake Onega. There are numerous lakes and rivers by the road. Vast areas of taiga forest dominate the landscape, and a section of the Scandinavian Mountains in Norway and western Sweden. 

There are rural villages as well as cities and towns by the Blue Highway.

The Development of the Blue Highway
 The idea of a road across Northern Europe was born in the 1950s
 The Blue Highway Association was formed in Sweden in 1963
 Year-round ferry service between Umeå and Vaasa in 1972
 The Blue Highway became a European Highway in 1973
 A cross-border public bus route between Mo i Rana and Umeå was established in 1989 (service withdrawn in 2014 between Mo i Rana and Hemavan)
 Border crossing (Niirala/Vyartsilya) with Russia was opened in 1990
 The Blue Road Highway extended to Pudozh, Russia, in 2000

Gallery

See also 
 European route E12

References

External links

 Blue Highway in Sweden (English)
 Finnish Travel Routes (English, Russian, Swedish, Finnish)
 Blue Highway in Finland (Finnish)
 Blue Highway in Russian

National Tourist Routes in Norway
Roads in Finland
Roads in Russia
Roads in Sweden
Petrozavodsk
Joensuu
Kuopio
Lapua
Mo i Rana
Siilinjärvi
Umeå
Vaasa
Russian tourist routes